The B.C. Wall House, also known as the “Sesame Lodge,” is located at North Augusta, Aiken County, South Carolina. It was constructed in 1902 by Budd Clay Wall (the mayor of North Augusta at the time) to serve as an overflow guest home from the Hampton Terrace Hotel. The home holds additional significance in that it was designed by a female architect, Wall's daughter, Martha Louise Wall Andrews.  The house, which is very visible from the public street, contains elements of the Queen Anne, Classical Revival, and Bungalow Styles. It was listed on the National Register of Historic Places on November 27, 1992.

References

Houses on the National Register of Historic Places in South Carolina
Queen Anne architecture in South Carolina
Neoclassical architecture in South Carolina
Houses completed in 1926
Houses in Aiken County, South Carolina
National Register of Historic Places in Aiken County, South Carolina
North Augusta, South Carolina